The Big Break is a reality television program broadcast by the Golf Channel. The show's premise was to award an aspiring professional golfer exemptions into selected events or full-season exemptions on lower-level tours. The series debuted on October 6, 2003.

Traditionally, the show airs at 9 p.m. Eastern time/6 p.m. Pacific time every Monday or Tuesday during its run. Tom Abbott replaced Vince Cellini as the male host at Big Break Sandals Resorts in the spring of 2010. Stephanie Sparks stayed on as female host. Sparks ended her run on the show when Michele Tafoya appeared as co-host for Big Break NFL in 2013. Melanie Collins co-hosted with Abbott on Big Break Florida and Big Break, The Palm Beaches, Florida. LPGA golfer Paige Mackenzie was the female host for Big Break Myrtle Beach in the fall of 2014.

Each episode is an hour long, though each season finale is two hours long. The show's chief signature is a giant rock that bears its logo. Until the 11th edition, there was a side rock with the Roman numeral identifying the edition. Now, each show is referred to only by its location.

The show was cancelled in 2015 because of budget cuts.

Format of the show
Contestants on each season of The Big Break include professionals on mini-tours as well as amateurs who aspire to play golf professionally.

The contestants engage in a series of golfing challenges, with the weakest performer eliminated after each challenge. At the end of the competition, the winner receives prizes including one or more exemptions into a top professional golf tournament.

Show challenges

The glass-breaking challenge
The show's signature challenge involves players breaking panes of glass, each containing a contestant's name (in The Big Break All-Star Challenge NASCAR Edition, it was changed to the contestant's last name on top and the stylised car number dominating the pane). This challenge usually takes place in the premiere episode of each edition, although in The Big Break II, it took place in the second episode, used in this case as the "Mulligan Challenge" (explained below).

The rules of the glass-breaking challenge changed from The Big Break I to The Big Break II. In The Big Break I, the ten players took aim at their own pane of glass, and all of them stood at a driving range, and fired shots at once. The first one to break his glass was the winner.

In The Big Break II and The Big Break III: Ladies Only, as well as The Big Break All-Star Challenge, players took turns, and had to call out whose glass they intended to break. If successful, the player whose glass pane was broken was eliminated for the rest of the challenge, and the last player whose glass pane remained unbroken was the winner. In "The Big Break II", tensions arose when "Team Bald" went after Don Donatello. Sean Daly (won the glass breaking competition), Shelby Chrest, and John Turke were the ones responsible for eliminating Don. In The Big Break III: Ladies Only, the winner of the challenge got first choice of the room in which they would stay during their tenure on the show (this, too, is explained below).

In The Big Break IV: USA vs. Europe, the format was tweaked again. The challenge became a relay. The first team to have all six of its members break their own glass won. For this edition, the challenge was used as a Mulligan Challenge.

For The Big Break V: Hawaii, the challenge was returned to its call-out format, but with a twist: when a player broke someone else's glass, they would keep shooting until they missed.

Mulligan challenges
The "Mulligan Challenge" was the first challenge contested in each hour-long episode, though in The Big Break II, it was the second challenge contested.

Past "Mulligan Challenges" have ranged from shooting golf balls into a large bucket sitting on a pickup truck as the truck moved back and forth to hitting balls through holes in a giant plywood wall for points. The holes ranged in size depending on point total, with the biggest hole being worth one point, and the smallest being worth five points. The winning individual or team in a "Mulligan Challenge" is awarded a mulligan to use in the "Skills Challenge".

Mulligan challenges were quite sparse in The Big Break V: Hawaii.

Skills challenge (a.k.a. "Immunity challenge")
The "Skills Challenge" is the second challenge contested in each hour-long episode, though in The Big Break II, it was the first challenge contested. The Big Break II is also where the "Skills Challenge" was first used.

Past "Skills Challenges" have ranged from players hitting drives for points to players attempting to score points by hitting balls into three large boxes, the largest being worth 5 points, the middle-sized box being worth 10 points, and the smallest box being worth 20 points. Another "Skills Challenge" involved players playing a game called "B-R-E-A-K", similar to the basketball game of "H-O-R-S-E". "Skills Challenges" usually take place in rounds, and the winner (or winners) of the "Mulligan Challenge" could use their mulligan at any point in the challenge if they are to make a mistake. The winner of the "Skills Challenge" is awarded immunity from the "Elimination Challenge."

In The Big Break IV: USA vs. Europe, the Immunity Challenge (as it became known during the show), was a team event. The team that won the Immunity Challenge would have all its members spared from elimination.

Elimination challenges
Each Big Break takes place in tournament-style form, as one player is eliminated from the show each week until there are two players left. So, the last challenge of each hour-long episode is the "Elimination Challenge."

The "Skills Challenge" winner is exempt from the "Elimination Challenge," so they can watch without taking part. The players not exempt from the "Elimination Challenge" participate in challenges such as hitting shots to the green for points. The closer to the pin, the more points one is awarded. The contestant who finishes last in any "Elimination Challenge" is eliminated from the show.

Eliminated players in the first three editions of the show were handled differently. In The Big Break I and The Big Break II, eliminated players were immediately sent home. In The Big Break III: Ladies Only, eliminated players were allowed to stay (some say required) with the remaining contestants until the show got down to its final two contestants, but at a different location from the one the remaining players were staying at.

In The Big Break IV: USA vs. Europe, the losing team in the Immunity Challenge had all of its members pitted against each other to stay alive.

Match play final
The last two players remaining on The Big Break play against one another in a match play final, which takes place in each season's two-hour finale. The winner of the final picks up the exemptions into the selected events on the tour those events are sanctioned by, as well as additional prizes.

Editions of The Big Break

The Big Break I

The Big Break I first aired, as said in the introduction, on October 6, 2003. The contest was filmed over ten days at the TreeTops Resort in Gaylord, Michigan. The winner would receive exemptions into four selected events on the Canadian Tour in 2004 (all broadcast by the Golf Channel).

The ten hopefuls for the first season were:

The show was hosted by Phil Mickelson's swing coach, Rick Smith, and Katherine Roberts. In the end, Justin Peters defeated Anthony Sorentino 3 & 1 in the matchplay final. Peters, though, failed to make the cut in any of the four Canadian Professional Golf Tour events he played in.

The Big Break II: Las Vegas

The Big Break II first aired in September 2004. The contest was filmed in Las Vegas. The winner would receive four exemptions into Nationwide Tour events during the 2005 season.

The ten contestants were:

(In Order of Elimination)

The Big Break II was the Golf Channel's highest rated show in its history of all programming. The show featured not only good golf but also some tension between roommates Sean Daly and Donny Donatello.

The winner Kip Henley failed to make any cuts on the Nationwide Tour, and shortly after his attempt to play his way on Tour, he went back to caddying on the PGA Tour for Brian Gay. Henley, who turned 50 in 2011, qualified for the FedEx St. Jude Classic through winning a Tennessee PGA Section event that included an automatic entry into the event, and has eligibility for the Champions Tour.

The Big Break III: Ladies Only

The Big Break III: Ladies Only first aired on February 8, 2005. The show was filmed in October 2004 at the Kingsmill Resort and Spa just outside Williamsburg, Virginia. The winner of this edition would receive exemptions into two LPGA events and a celebrity tournament (the American Century Championship) in 2005, not all of which aired on the Golf Channel. Also, a leading golf retailer, Golf Galaxy, was offering $5,000 so that the winning player could purchase whatever they need for the LPGA events, such as new clubs or other accessories. The first of those three tournaments was the Michelob ULTRA Open at Kingsmill, held at the golf resort where the show was filmed. The Michelob ULTRA Open is commonly referred to as the LPGA's "fifth major," much like The Players Championship is for the PGA Tour.

The ten hopefuls for the third season were:

Vince Cellini and Stephanie Sparks, who once briefly played on the LPGA Tour herself, became the show's new hosts. The matchplay final was stellar. Crikelair and Amiee faced off, with Crikelair going 2 up after just three holes. Amiee came all the way back, and, at 1 up on the par 3 17th, sank a birdie to go 2 up, and clinch The Big Break III title 2 & 1. In addition to her exemptions and $5,000 gift card from Golf Galaxy, Amiee also won a new Chrysler Crossfire, which she gave to a friend who had helped her financially. Amiee also donated her Golf Galaxy certificate to a charity for underprivileged children.

Also for the first time, professional golfers from the tour handing out the exemptions made cameos. In the first episode of the season in which a contestant was eliminated (whom, by the way, would end up being Browner), LPGA winners Kelli Kuehne and Lorie Kane dropped by to participate in the season's first "Mulligan Challenge."

Amiee's first tournament, the Michelob ULTRA Open, did not go well as far as trying to make the cut was concerned. She had plenty of fans following her. In her first round, Amiee shot 79 on the par-71 course. The second round was pushed back a day due to rain, where Amiee shot 77, missing the cut in her first LPGA event. Her second event, the Corning Classic, never materialized, as she withdrew before the first round, citing a back injury, throwing her second exemption away. However, it is believed that Amiee withdrew because of media pressure over an alleged topless photo of her that was circulating around the Internet. There has been a great deal of discussion over the validity of the photo.

Meanwhile, Miller, who actually played on the LPGA Tour from 1979 to 1981, when she married former PGA Tour player Allen Miller (the couple are still married, and have three children), competed in the LPGA Championship, having earned a spot by winning the 2004 LPGA Teaching & Club Professionals national championship. She shot an 84 in the first round, and an 88 in the second round, missing the cut.

It was then Dowling's turn to play in an LPGA event. She took part in the BMO Canadian Women's Open, where she shot a 77 in round one, and a 74 in round two to take a respectable 7-over for the tournament, though she still missed the cut. Dowling won the Canadian Women's Amateur Championship in 2000, helping her earn the Female Canadian Amateur Golfer of the Year Award; she was also individual champion of the Mid-American Conference in 1999 and 2000 while a student at Kent State University, and in her senior year at Kent State in 2002, she was given the Janet Bachna Award for Kent State Female Senior Athlete of the Year. While at Kent State, Dowling became friends with the winner of the 2003 The Open Championship, Ben Curtis. Dowling says her golfing hero is the great Canadian professional, Moe Norman, who died on September 4, 2004, over a month before the show began taping.

The Big Break All-Star Challenge
When The Big Break was first announced, a lot of celebrities applied for the show in addition to aspiring pros. The Golf Channel soon created a celebrity edition of the show, this one to benefit charities. On March 22, 2005, The Big Break All-Star Challenge debuted, featuring four members of the Boston Red Sox. Since then, there have been many more editions of the show, featuring NASCAR drivers, as well as members of the Green Bay Packers, the Chicago White Sox, the Tampa Bay Lightning, the cast of Scrubs, and the band Hootie & The Blowfish. There have been many various hosts of the All-Star edition, and not once have Cellini and Sparks co-hosted an episode together. Other Golf Channel personalities who have hosted the All-Star edition include Brian Hammons and Steve Sands, and some co-hosts have included former NASCAR star Benny Parsons and two-time Champions Tour major winner Peter Jacobsen.

Jay Kossoff, the senior producer of The Big Break, told The Charlotte Observer at the taping of the first NASCAR edition, "We had a lot of celebrities apply for spots in the original shows, so we figured it was a neat idea to do something like this — let's take the next step."

The Big Break IV: USA vs. Europe
See the main article: The Big Break IV: USA vs. Europe.

The Big Break IV was filmed in June 2005, and premiered on September 13 of the same year. The twelve hopefuls (including The Big Break II contestant Bart Lower) were taken to Scotland's Carnoustie, and the Old Course in St Andrews to compete for exemptions into two European Tour events (the Algarve Open de Portugal and the Celtic Manor Wales Open), an endorsement deal with Bridgestone Golf, a two-year lease on a Ford Explorer, and a $5,000 gift card from Dick's Sporting Goods. The Golf Channel made this a competition between players from the United States and Europe, much like the Ryder Cup. Cellini and Sparks returned as hosts.

Team USA

Team Europe

Lower was the first contestant eliminated, surprising, considering the fact that he finished third on The Big Break II. Gillot, who won a Challenge Tour event in 2000, was the next to go, followed by Carnell, then Gardino. The USA-Europe elimination trade-off continued with Gainey getting the boot. It finally stopped with Hunt being eliminated in a two-part episode (the Immunity Challenge took a full hour, while Elimination took another). With just two members left, Team USA was given two episodes off so that the European team could be whittled down to its last two. In the first episode of this, ex-Amateur Championship winner Bladon was out, with Wilde to follow the next week. The final two were determined in a double-elimination episode, in which Woodman defeated Blankvoort and Holtby manhandled Valentine in separate 9-hole matchplay challenges. Holtby went on to defeat Woodman in the matchplay final, 1 Up. Unlike the previous editions, all the eliminated contestants stayed, followed the match and even took group photos with the winner.

In the Algarve Open, Holtby shot 1-over for two rounds, missing the cut by one shot.

Tommy Gainey finished high enough in the December, 2007 PGA Tour 'Q-School' to become a member of the PGA for 2008, and in October 2012 won the McGladrey Classic in Georgia for his first PGA Tour win.

Each team had one member with a claim to fame. European team player Wilde is the son of British singer Marty Wilde and the brother of Kim Wilde, who sang the 1981 hit, "Kids in America." Team USA member Valentine is the son of former professional bowler Jeffrey Valentine. Another European team member, Gardino, has caddied in two Ryder Cups (1999 and 2002), carrying bags for players like Sergio García, Miguel Ángel Jiménez, and José María Olazábal. Gardino also caddied for Ángel Cabrera in the 2005 Presidents Cup and the 2007 U.S. Open

During the show's run, a new behind-the-scenes show called The Big Break IV: All Access debuted and aired on "Top Shelf Wednesday," a weekly primetime block of programming hosted by Cellini. Big Break III alumnus Ochoa worked as a reporter for the All Access show.

Promotional ads leading up to the show's premiere were set to Bon Jovi's 1987 hit "Livin' On a Prayer."

The Big Break V: Hawaii

The Big Break V: Hawaii was another "ladies only" edition, and was filmed from October 16 to the 30, 2005, in Hawaii on the North Shore of Oahu at the Turtle Bay Resort, site of the LPGA's SBS Open at Turtle Bay, and premiered on February 7, 2006, a day short of the first anniversary of the premiere of The Big Break III. Cellini and Sparks returned for their third stint as hosts. All Access also returned, with Wilde as the reporter this time around.

This Big Break contained the show's largest prize package yet: the lone LPGA exemption will be into the 2006 Safeway Classic. Other prizes were a Bridgestone Golf equipment contract, a $10,000 prize package from Golfsmith, and a 2006 Chrysler Crossfire Roadster. The winner also got a developmental package prior to their LPGA start, something viewers have been suggesting for quite a while now. The package contained exemptions into all remaining 2006 Futures Tour events, golfing instruction from Dean Reinmuth, fitness training from former show host Roberts, and mental coaching from Dr. Gio Valiante.

11 golfers arrived in the Aloha State, but one was to be sent home before she could even unpack her bags. These 11 golfers were:

In the matchplay final, which aired on May 9, Prange defeated Cho 5 & 4 in the show's most lopsided matchplay final victory to date.

Since Big Break V, Prange has won twice on the Futures Tour (The Greater Tampa Futures Golf Classic and the Horseshoe Casino Futures Golf Classic) and has three other top ten finishes.

The Big Break VI: Trump National

The sixth edition The Big Break taped in late June and early July 2006 at the Trump National Golf Club in Los Angeles. The show premiered on September 26, 2006, with the finale taking place on December 19, 2006, and is a co-ed edition, with eight men and eight women competing for exemptions on the LPGA Tour and Champions Tours. On the ladies' side, Briana Vega defeated Bridget Dwyer by a score of 3 and 1, while Denny Hepler needed a 19th hole to finally clinch a win over Jeff Mitchell. Briana Vega became the ultimate winner by defeating Denny Hepler in a nine-hole skins match. After winning the last 4 out of the 9 holes, Bri was awarded $21,000 and a new car, while the women who partnered with her in holes 6 through 8 split $11,000. Denny won $9000 while the men who partnered with him in holes 1 thru 5 split $9,000.

The Big Break VII: Reunion

The seventh season of The Big Break featured 16 returning female and male contestants from the first 6 seasons. It was filmed at Reunion Resort & Club in Kissimmee, Florida and premiered February 25, 2007. In the first part of the 3 person finale, Tommy Gainey played the first 9 holes at 2 under par. Ashley Gomez and Mike Foster each finished 1 over par, and Ashley then eliminated Mike in a sudden death hole. In the final nine holes of match play, Tommy defeated Ashley 3 & 2.

The Big Break Mesquite
For the first time on any edition of The Big Break, the eighth season offered an exemption into the Mayakoba Classic.

Premiering October 2, 2007, this season returned to the original format of 12 men competing for the title: Rick Schwartz and Stephanie Sparks were the hosts.

Future PGA Tour winner Matt Every was a contestant.

Big Break Ka'anapali
The ninth season premiered on April 15, 2008. It featured an all-female cast and was again filmed in Hawaii, this time at Ka'anapali Resort in Maui. New hosts were Stina Sternberg and Andrew Magee. The winner received an exemption into the 2008 Navistar LPGA Classic, entry fees to all 2009 Futures Tour tournaments waived, an Adams Golf endorsement deal, and a BMW Z4 Coupe. In the final, Kim Welch overcame an early 2 hole deficit to defeat Sophie Sandolo 4 & 3.

Contestants

Big Break X: Michigan
The 10th season premiered on October 7, 2008. Eight two-person teams composed of a male and female competed at Boyne Highlands Resort. Stina Sternberg and Billy Ray Brown were the hosts. In this season the finale was broken into 3 parts: 6 holes of best ball, 6 holes of alternate shot, and 6 holes of aggregate score. Haymes and Bernadette defeated Hugo and Camila 2 & 1.

Contestants

 Haymes Snedeker is the brother of PGA Tour player Brandt Snedeker.

 Amber is the sister of The Big Break V: Hawaii winner Ashley Prange.

Big Break Prince Edward Island
The 11th season aired in Summer 2009. Six women and six men competed for a grand prize of $100,000 in cash. Contestants included a former Marine Captain who had served in Afghanistan in 2003, and a model. The hosts were Charlie Rymer and Stina Sternberg.

Derek Gillespie was the only male to reach the final four and then survived a 2-hole elimination match with Gerina Mendoza, by 1 stroke. In the first half of the finale, Gillespie played 9 holes at −1 while Blair O'Neal was +1 and Brenda McLarnon was eliminated at +3. In the last 9 holes, the match-up was O'Neal vs. Gillespie, with Gillespe winning by a three-stroke margin (−1 to +2).

Big Break Disney Golf
This twelfth season, Big Break Disney Golf premiered on October 13, 2009. Challenges took place at courses and off-course locations in and around Walt Disney World in Orlando, Florida. Vince Cellini and Stephanie Sparks returned as hosts.

Contestants:
 Mike Perez (Scottsdale, Arizona) – Nationwide Tour member and brother of PGA Tour player Pat Perez. Winner, Defeated Tony Finau in extra holes after Tony hit it in the water on the 17th hole to tie the score and won on the 19th hole to win Big Break Disney Golf.
 Tony Finau (Lehi, Utah) – Brother of contestant Gipper Finau. Turned professional at age 17 and made a cut on the PGA Tour the same year.  Finau eventually won on the 2016 PGA Tour and made the Tour Championship in 2019.
 Kevin Erdman (Arcadia, California) – Husband of Big Break Ka'anapali contestant Courtney Erdman.
 Gipper Finau (Lehi, Utah) – Brother of contestant Tony Finau. Turned professional at age 16: eliminated week 9
 Andrew Giuliani (New York, New York) – Son of former mayor of New York City Rudy Giuliani: eliminated week 8
 Blake Moore (Monrovia, California) – Friend of former Big Break competitor and PGA Tour player James Nitties: eliminated week 7
 Vincent Johnson (Portland, Oregon) – Received the Charlie Sifford exemption to play in the 2009 Northern Trust Open: eliminated week 6
 J.R. Reyes (Omaha, Nebraska) – Former NJCAA All-American. Waits tables at a diner to support his dream of playing golf professionally: eliminated week 5
 Sean Kalin (Delray Beach, Florida) – Former junior star golfer who gave up the game for 20 years after being kidnapped: eliminated week 4
 Kevan Maxwell (Charleston, South Carolina) – Pizza delivery man: eliminated week 3
 Andreas Huber (Scottsdale, Arizona) – A former Wall Street broker and the son of actress Susan Lucci: eliminated week 2
 Ed Moses (Hollywood, California) – A gold and silver medal winner as a member of the United States swim team at the 2000 Olympic Games: eliminated week 1

Big Break Sandals Resort

In the exciting finale, Carling Coffing made a 25-foot birdie putt on the 17th hole to take the lead over Lili Alvarez. Coffing won the match 1 up.

Contestants

Elimination chart

 Won immunity before play began

Big Break Dominican Republic
This season, which debuted on September 28, 2010, saw some significant format changes. For one thing, it became a pure team competition. The object of this season was to be the first team to remove all members of the other team in a double elimination format. A contestant losing the individual challenge at the end of the show was "benched" for the next program. A second loss by a "benched" contestant constitutes elimination. Individual prizes - cash, shopping sprees and tour exemptions - are awarded by way of a points system. The contestant on the winning team with the most points will be declared the "most valuable player" and will receive the prizes.

The teams, both composed of past Big Break contestants, are divided into men (blue shirts) and women (red shirts). If a male player is MVP, he will win an exemption to the PGA Tour Justin Timberlake Shriners Hospitals for Children Open in Las Vegas. If the MVP is female, she will win an exemption to the LPGA Tour Kia Classic in Industry, California. Blair O'Neal was the winner.

The show is taped at the Teeth of the Dog course at the Casa de Campo Resort. The course was designed by Pete Dye.

Tensions ran high this season because of the "battle of the sexes" format. There was far more cheering, fist-pumping, and cursing from the players than in a typical season. Also the eliminated players remained on the benches throughout the season to root on their teammates. After the girls team benched 4 guys in a row, Elena said in confessional, “I think the guys team is more concerned with the fact that America is going to laugh at them for getting their ass kicked by a bunch of hot girls”.

Prior to the finale, David, Brenda, Elena, and Sara received 2 strikes and were eliminated from the competition. This left 5 men and 3 women. Sara was then selected to return to the competition after the women holed out a shot from off the green. Because Blair never got any strikes, she received 10 MVP points and jumped to the top of the standings.

In the finale, Andrew, Anthony, Blake, Brian, and William competed for the men. Blair, Christina, Sara, and Lori competed for the women.

The men won the team challenge and got to select the match-ups and holes for the elimination matches.

In round 1, Blair defeated William, Blake defeated Lori, Sara defeated Brian, and Christina defeated Andrew.

In round 2. Blair defeated Anthony and Christina defeated Blake.

Sara, Christina, and Blair survived and the women won 3 players to 0. All 3 women made a birdie in an elimination hole.
Blair added 10 MVP points for her 2 wins and finished with 57 MVP points in first place (12 points ahead of second).

The winner of the Big Break Dominican Republic was Blair O'Neal and she won $50,000 and other prizes including an LPGA exemption while the rest of her team split another $50,000. Anthony was the male MVP and won the PGA exemption.

Big Break Indian Wells
A portion of the following season of The Big Break was shown on the Golf Channel on December 2, 2010. Raymond Floyd's son Robert was one of the contestants.

Contestants

Big Break Ireland

Big Break Ireland was contested in the K Club in Straffan, County Kildare, Ireland. It premiered on September 20, 2011. This was the first season where the men eliminated all the women prior to the finale. Mallory was the top female and finished in 3rd place. Mark Murphy won the season finale against Julien Trudeau.

Contestants

Team Liffey

Team Straffan

Big Break Atlantis

Big Break Atlantis was contested at the Ocean Club Golf Course on Paradise Island, The Bahamas. It premiered on May 14, 2012.

Contestants

Big Break Greenbrier
The 18th season of Big Break featured 12 men and premiered October 2, 2012. Mark Silvers defeated James Lepp in the finale. With the win Silvers received a sponsor's exemption to the 2013 Greenbrier Classic. He missed the cut posting a +2 36-hole score.

Big Break Mexico
The 19th season featured 6 men and 6 women. The contestants were divided into 3 teams of 4. Halfway through the season all 4 members of Team Maya remained while the other teams were down to 1 player each. The players remaining on the other teams, Brent and Matthew each eliminated several players. Taylor Collins who hadn't been in an elimination match prior to the semifinals, defeated Brent in the semifinal and Matthew by 2 holes in the final to become Big Break Champion.

Taylor became the first female on Big Break to defeat a male in an 18-hole final. As the winner, Taylor earned entry into the LPGA's Lorena Ochoa Invitational. Had the winner been male, he would have earned entry into the OHL Classic at Mayakoba.

Big Break Puerto Rico / NFL

Aired starting October 8, 2013.  Six teams, each composed of one male Big Break alumnus, one female Big Break alumna, and an NFL star, competed. The NFL players were Mark Rypien, Jerry Rice, Tim Brown, Marc Bulger, Al Del Greco, and Chris Doleman.  Each member of the winning team received $50,000 - the NFL player's prize going to the charity of his choice.

Big Break Florida

Big Break Florida premiered on 24 February 2014. The season was hosted at Omni Amelia Island Plantation in Amelia Island, Florida. Melanie Collins replaced Stephanie Sparks as female host. The winner received over $175,000 in cash and prizes, entry into the 2014 Manulife Financial LPGA Classic, and a full-season exemption on the second-tier Symetra Tour with all entry fees paid. The winner was Jackie Stoelting.

Big Break Myrtle Beach
The Myrtle Beach installment premiered on October 7, 2014. Paige Mackenzie was the new female host. The winner will receive over $180,000 in cash and prizes. If the winner is male, he receives a full-season exemption on the NGA Pro Golf Tour (renamed SwingThought.com Tour in October 2014) and an invitation to the 2015 Valspar Championship. If female, she received a full season Symetra Tour exemption with all entry fees paid and entry into 2015 Portland Classic.

This season introduced Super Immunity, in which a player could skip any elimination challenge after failing to win regular Immunity in the season. Charlie beat Tessa in the final round to win Super Immunity but chose not to use it in 3 opportunities in order to try to win a $10,000 prize. The first time he wasn't selected for the elimination match. The second time Tessa challenged him and was eliminated in 6th place. The last time Jimmy challenged and eliminated him in 5th place.

Anthony, Emily, Jimmy and Toph advanced to the semifinals. Jimmy defeated Toph in the finale to earn the Valspar exemption, where he missed the cut.

Contestants

Big Break The Palm Beaches
The 23rd installment premiered February 2, 2015. The winner received over $180,000 in cash and prizes, including a sponsor exemption to the Barbasol Championship. The winner of the competition was Richy Werenski. This is the final series location. In May 2015, NBC Universal released most of the production staff of Original Productions, the division of the Golf Channel that created and produced the show since its beginning in 2003. That same group created and produced "Altered Course", another golf-based competition show premiering in June 2015.

Also featured in this season was the trick shot duo, The Bryan Brothers, including George and Wesley Bryan. Wesley Bryan played on mini-tours before earning his Web.com Tour card for 2016 by finishing T-9 at qualifying school. In his third event of the 2016 season, he won the Chitimacha Louisiana Open. He picked up a second win a month later at the El Bosque Mexico Championship. In August, he won his third event of the season, the Digital Ally Open, to earn promotion to the PGA Tour. He was the eleventh golfer to do so. He won the 2016 Web.com Tour Player of the Year award.

Special Editions

In addition to the regular Big Break shows with the standard format there were two special edition shows.  The first was Big Break Academy, an instructional program featuring the most recently eliminated contestant from Big Break. It premiered May 15, 2012 hosted by Michael Breed.

The second was the Big Break Invitational, a golf tournament held at Reynolds Lake Oconee, in collaboration with The Golf Channel, on September 30, 2014 - October 3, 2014 in Eatonton, GA. The event was held on the Jack Nicklaus designed Great Waters course along the shores of Lake Oconee. Forty contestants from previous Big Break events were invited to play in the championship with a $300,000 total purse. The event was a knockout format with 12 players winning their way into the final day. Jay Woodson, Big Break Mexico, took home the winner's trophy and $100,000. Finishing second was Emily Talley while Tommy "Two Gloves" Gainey finished in a tie for third with current PGA superstar Tony Finau. The Big Break Invitational was supposed to be an annual event, but in 2015 NBC, parent company of The Golf Channel, decided they wanted to go in a different direction with the show.

References

External links 
 

 
Golf Channel original programming
Golf on NBC
2003 American television series debuts
2015 American television series endings
2000s American reality television series
2010s American reality television series